Colossians 1 is the first chapter of the Epistle to the Colossians in the New Testament of the Christian Bible. Traditionally, it is believed to have been written for the churches in Colossae and Laodicea (see ) by Apostle Paul, with Timothy as his co-author, while he was in prison in Ephesus (years 53–54), although there are debatable claims that it is the work of a secondary imitator, or that it was written in Rome (in the early 60s). This chapter contains the greeting, thanksgiving and prayer, followed by a "Christological Hymn" and the overall thesis of the letter.

Text

The original text was written in Koine Greek. This chapter is divided into 29 verses.

Textual witnesses
Some early manuscripts containing the text of this chapter are:
Papyrus 46 (c. AD 200)
Codex Vaticanus (325–350)
Codex Sinaiticus (330–360)
Codex Alexandrinus (400–440)
Codex Ephraemi Rescriptus (c. 450; extant verses 3–29)
Codex Freerianus (c. 450; extant verses 1:1–4, 10–12, 20–22, 27–29)
Codex Claromontanus (c. 550; in Greek and Latin)
Codex Coislinianus (c. 550; extant verses 26–29)

Greeting (1:1–2)

Verse 1
 Paul, an apostle of Jesus Christ by the will of God, and Timothy our brother,
The mention of Timothy alone among the fellow believers who were with Paul at that time suggests that he was the co-author of this epistle.

Verse 2
To the saints and faithful brethren in Christ who are in Colosse:
 Grace to you and peace from God our Father and the Lord Jesus Christ.
The location is usually known as "Colossae", but the King James Version and its "new" equivalent both use the name "Colosse". J. B. Lightfoot also refers to the spelling "Colassae" in his commentary.

Paul's opening greeting in his epistles normally mentions "a double source of divine benefactions: 'from God our/the Father and the Lord Jesus Christ'. The omission of the second element may be due to the presence of 'in Christ' in the first part of this verse.

Thanksgiving (1:3–8)
In most of his letters, Paul follows the greeting with a note of thanksgiving to God for his recipients, which "carefully reflect[s] Paul's assessment of the state of the community, and reveal his concerns". The information about the believers at Colossae was obtained from Epaphras, who was also from Colossae (Colossians 4:12).

Prayer for the Future (1:9–11)
The believers have been the object of Paul's constant concern, so he asks God to make them understand his will, do good works and persevere.

Conversion (1:12–14)
This section is actually still within one unbroken sentence with the previous, but in here Paul describes the crucial conversion of the believers into the form displayed by Christ, that is "by incorporation into Christ in baptism, the structures of the world are replaced by new values".

The Christological Hymn (1:15–20)
A pattern of a 'Christological Hymn' in verses 15–20 has been hinted multiple times in the past without any hypothesis getting significant support. Jerome Murphy-O'Connor offers a reconstruction that shows "two four-line strophes" as follows:

Verse 15
 He is the image of the invisible God, the firstborn over all creation.
See Names and titles of Jesus in the New Testament.

Verse 16
 For by Him all things were created that are in heaven and that are on earth, visible and invisible, whether thrones or dominions or principalities or powers. 
 All things were created through Him and for Him.

Verse 17
 And He is before all things, and in Him all things consist.

Verse 18
 And He is the head of the body, the church, who is the beginning, the firstborn from the dead, that in all things He may have the preeminence.

Verses 19–20
 For it pleased the Father that in Him all the fullness should dwell, and by Him to reconcile all things to Himself, by Him, whether things on earth or things in heaven, having made peace through the blood of His cross.

The Thesis of the Letter (1:21–23)
The three verses in this part enunciate the major themes of the epistle: past present and future, the journey of the Colossian believers from alienation through reconciliation to perseverance.

Servant of the Mystery (1:24–2:5)
This section continues to chapter 2, dealing with Paul's sufferings which "reveal the present reality of grace" as a member of the body of Christ.

Verses 24–26
 I now rejoice in my sufferings for you, and fill up in my flesh what is lacking in the afflictions of Christ, for the sake of His body, which is the church, of which I became a minister according to the stewardship from God which was given to me for you, to fulfill the word of God, the mystery which has been hidden from ages and from generations, but now has been revealed to His saints.
 "Fill up in my flesh what is lacking in the afflictions of Christ": Murphy-O'Connor prefers a more literal translation as given by Aletti: "I complete what is lacking in the sufferings-of-Christ-in-my-flesh" (cf. Galatians 2:20) with no reference to the "individual Jesus Christ", because Paul's sufferings is due to him being a member of Christ's body (cf. ).

See also
 Colosse
 Epaphras
 Jesus Christ
 Paul of Tarsus
 Timothy
 Related Bible parts: Acts 9, 2 Corinthians 1, 2 Corinthians 4, 2 Corinthians 11, Philippians 3

Notes

References

Bibliography

External links
 King James Bible - Wikisource
English Translation with Parallel Latin Vulgate
Online Bible at GospelHall.org (ESV, KJV, Darby, American Standard Version, Bible in Basic English)
Multiple bible versions at Bible Gateway (NKJV, NIV, NRSV etc.)

01